The Magician from Mars was a Golden Age superheroine created by John Giunta and Malcolm Kildale for Centaur Publications' Amazing-Man Comics. who appeared in five issues of Amazing-Man Comics (#7-11, Nov 1939-Apr 1940), thereby predating other early comics superheroines such as Fantomah and Wonder Woman. 

The Magician's real name is given as "Jane 6ᴇᴍ35" in the first installment (though the second changes her surname to "Q-X3"). She is born on Mars at some unspecified point in the future at which interplanetary travel is unremarkable, to an Earth mother and Martian father. Her superpowers are the result of accidental exposure to cathode rays as an infant having a unique effect on her hybrid heritage. These powers are apparently based on the ability to utilize 100% of her brain; they are somewhat vaguely delimited, but include telekinesis, super-strength, gravity nullification, the ability to cast illusions and transform matter, and immortality. Jane / the Magician is also an accomplished pilot, and almost every installment sees her flying an airplane or rocketship.

The only person aware of Jane's unique talents is her mother, who raises her on Mars. After the deaths of both her parents by the age of sixteen, guardianship is assumed by Jane's aunt Kanza, who dislikes her and eventually confines her to a cell. Jane uses her powers to escape and board a spaceship heading to Earth; after the ship is struck by a meteor, she takes advantage of the confusion to steal three million dollars in gold before absconding in an escape pod. Landing on Earth, she donates half of the money to a doctor trying to cure childhood paralysis and keeps the other half to fund her new superhero career. The strip's final two installments saw the Magician fighting an anonymous villainous mastermind, the Hood, who first tried to conquer the Earth and then launched a war against the king of Mars. The Magician traveled to Mars and saved the kingdom, but at the cost of the life of Martian prince Taal, her love interest; she also discovered the Hood was actually her aunt Kanza, who is without explanation shown to possess powers similar to her own.

References

External links

Centaur Publications characters
Comics characters introduced in 1939
Female characters in comics
Golden Age superheroes